Ashani (also known as IOF .32 pistol) is a semi-automatic .32 calibre (7.65 mm) pistol designed and manufactured by the Ordnance Factory Board's Gun and Shell Factory and Rifle Factory Ishapore. The pistol is manufactured for concealed carry when permitted.

It's been developed by OFB in house based on colt 1903 pistol although it externally resembles FN 1903 and Remington model 51.  The pistol can be cosmetically modified by changing its aesthetic.

Variant

Ashani Mk I
The Mk I has a length of 158mm.

Ashani Mk II
The Mk II was officially launched on December 23, 2017. It has a length of 163mm.

It retails at 85,000 rupee (About US$1090).

It still remains overpriced as it is inferior to the western arms of comparable price.

References

External links
 
 

.32 ACP semi-automatic pistols
Handguns of India